Blem may refer to:

Blem (brand), the name of Pledge (brand) in Argentina
"Blem" (song), Drake 
"Blem", by Duke Ellington from Up in Duke's Workshop
BLEM vehicle tires are those which have some cosmetic or aesthetic imperfection.

Acronyms
BLEM, Bataillon de Légion étrangère de Madagascar